Nikolai Ivanovich Kozin (born 27 December 1955) is a Russian football coach and a former player.

External links
 

1955 births
People from Gulkevichsky District
Living people
Soviet footballers
FC Volga Nizhny Novgorod players
FC Akhmat Grozny players
FC Kuban Krasnodar players 
FC Lokomotiv Nizhny Novgorod players
Soviet football managers
Russian footballers
Russian football managers
FC Lokomotiv Nizhny Novgorod managers
Russian Premier League managers
FC Volgar Astrakhan managers
Association football defenders
FC Khimik Dzerzhinsk players
Sportspeople from Krasnodar Krai